This is a list of political offices which have been held by a woman, with details of the first woman holder of each office. It is ordered by the countries in Africa and by dates of appointment. Please observe that this list is meant to contain only the first woman to hold of a political office, and not all the female holders of that office.

Algeria

Antiquity
 Monarch -  Tin Hinan - 4th century

Republic
 Secretary of State of Social Affairs  – Z'hour Ounissi  – 1982
 Vice-Minister of Education  – Leila Khira Taib  – 1984
 Minister of Social Affairs  – Z'hour Ounissi  – 1984
 Minister of Education (And third in the Cabinet)  – Z'hour Ounissi  –  1986
 Minister of Health  – Nafissa Lalliam  – 1991
 Minister of Youth and Sports  – Leïla Aslaoui  – 1991
 Minister of State for National Solidarity  – Saida Benhabyles  – 1992
 Minister-Councillor for Juridical and Administrative Questions  – Meriem Belmilhoub Zerdani  – 1993
 Secretary of State for National Solidarity and the Family  – Aïcha Hénia Semichi  – 1995
 Minister of National Solidarity and Family  – Rabéa Mechrane  – 1997
 Secretary of State of Culture  – Zahia Benarous  – 1997
 Minister of Culture – Khalida Toumi - 2002; Nadia Labidi – 2014
 Minister of Education – Nouria Benghabrit-Remaoun – 2014
 Minister of Land-Use Planning and Environment – Dalila Boudjemaa – 2014
 Minister of Family and Women – Mounia Meslem – 2014
 Minister of Post, Information Technology and Communication Women – Zahra Dardouri – 2014
 Minister of Tourism  – Nouria Yamina Zerhouni – 2014
 Minister of Artisana & Handicrafts - Aish Tabagho – 2014

Angola 
 Vice-Minister of Internal Trade – Maria Mambo Café – 1977
 Minister of Social Affairs – Maria Mambo Café – 1982
 Minister of Justice - Guilhermina Contreiras da Costa Prata - 2008-2012

Benin

 Minister of Public Health – Rafiatou Karimou – 1989
Minister of Justice - Grace d'Almeida - 1995-1996
Foreign minister – Mariam Aladji Boni Diallo – 2006

Botswana

 Minister of Trade and Industry – Gaositwe K.T. Chiepe – 1974
 Foreign minister – Gaositwe K.T. Chiepe – 1985
 Chairperson of the House of Chiefs – Mosadi Seboko – 2003
Minister of Justice - Lesego Motsumi - 2010-2011

Burkina Faso
 Minister of Social Welfare, Housing and Labour – Célestine Ouezzin Coulibaly – 1958
 Minister of Justice - Marie Louise Nignan-Bassolet -1982-1983

Burundi

 Minister for Women's Questions  – Euphrasie Kandeke – 1982
Prime Minister – Sylvie Kinigi – 1993
President (acting) – Sylvie Kinigi – 1993
Minister of Justice - Clotilde Niragira - 2005-2007 
Foreign minister – Antoinette Batumubwira – 2006

Cameroon
 Member of Parliament - Julienne Keutcha - 1960
 Vice-Minister of Health and Public Welfare   – Delphine Zanga Tsogo – 1970
 Minister of Social Affairs  – Delphine Zanga Tsogo – 1975

Cape Verde

 Minister for Fisheries, Agriculture and Rural Development  – Maria Helena Nobre de Morais Querido Semedo – 1993
Minister of Justice - Januaria Moreira - 1999-2001 
Foreign minister – Fátima Veiga – 2002
 Defence minister – Cristina Fontes Lima – 2006

Central African Republic

 Government minister (Social Affairs) – Marie-Joséphe Franck – 1970
 Prime Minister – Elisabeth Domitien – 1975
 Foreign minister – Léonie Banga-Bothy – 2013
 Head of State – Catherine Samba-Panza – 2014
Minister of Justice - Isabelle Gaudeuille -2014-2016

Chad
 Minister of Social Affairs and Women – Fatimé Kimto – 1982

Comoros

Secretary of State for Population and the Condition of Women - Sittou Raghadat Mohamed - 1991 (First female appointed to a senior government position)
Member of the Assembly of the Union of the Comoros – Djoueria Abdallah – 2004

Congo-Brazzaville

 Member of Parliament - Micheline Golengo, Pierrette Kombo and Mambou Aimée Gnali - 1963
 Minister of Public Service – Charlotte Kisimba – 1970
 Minister of Social Affairs - Emilie Manima - 1975
 Minister of Primary Education - Bernadette Bayone - 1984
 Minister of Labour and Social Affairs - Jeanne Dambendzet - 1989

Democratic Republic of the Congo

Zaire
 Minister of Social Affairs – Sophie Kanza – 1967
 Foreign minister – Ekila Liyonda – 1987

Republic 
 Chief of Staff (Prime Minister) - Marie-Thérèse Nlandu Mpolo Nene
 Speaker of the National Assembly - Jeanine Mabunda - 2019

Djibouti 

 Cabinet member - Hawa Ahmed Youssouf - 1999

Egypt

Ancient
 Pharaoh (monarch) – Sobekneferu – 1806 BC (First known female Head of State in history)

Republic
 Member of Parliament – Rawya Ateya – 1957 (First female Member of Parliament in the Arab world)
 Minister (for Social Affairs) – Dr. Hikmat Abu Zayd – 1962
Ambassador of Egypt - Aisha Rateb - 1979 
 Mayor – Eva Habil, (Komboha) – 2008

Equatorial Guinea

 Minister of Womens Participation – Christina Ndjombe Ndjangani – 1978
 Minister of Justice - Evangelina Filomena Oyo Ebule - 2014-2018

Eritrea

 Minister of Justice - Fozia Hashim - 1993

Ethiopia

 Monarch – Empress Zewditu – 1916
 Member of Parliament – Senedu Gebru – 1957
 Assistant Minister of Foreign Affairs – Youdith Imre – 1966
 Deputy Minister of Foreign Affairs – Youdith Imre – 1971
 Minister of Education – Woizero Mary Tadesso – 1991
 Minister of Health – Adanetch Kidane Miriam – 1991
Leader of a Political Party (Unity for Democracy and Justice Party) - Birtukan Mideksa - 2009
President - Sahle-Work Zewde – 2018
Mayor of Addis Ababa – Adanech Abebe – 2021

Gabon

 Minister of Social Affairs and Women  – Antoniette Oliveira – 1980
Minister of Justice - Sophie Diouly - 1987-1989 
Foreign minister – Pascaline Mferri Bongo – 1991
 President (interim) – Rose Francine Rogombé – 2009 
 Speaker of Senate – Rose Francine Rogombé – 2009

The Gambia

 Minister of Youth, Sport and Culture – Louise N'Jie – 1982
Minister of Justice and Attorney General of the Gambia - Hawa Sisay-Sabally 1996-1998 
Vice President – Isatou Njie-Saidy – 1997
 Foreign minister – Susan Waffa-Ogoo – 2012

Ghana

 Minister of Social Affairs – Suzanna Al-Hassan – 1963
 Foreign minister – Gloria Amon Nikoi – 1979
Minister of Justice and Attorney General - Betty Mould-Iddrisu - 2009-2011 
Speaker of Parliament - Joyce Bamford-Addo - 2009-2013

Guinea

 Secretary of State for Social Affairs – Camara Loffo – 1961
 Minister of Social Affairs – Jeanne Martin-Cissé – 1976
 Foreign minister – Mahawa Bangoura – 2000
Minister of Justice - Paulette Kourouma - 2007-2008

Guinea-Bissau

 Minister of Health and Social Affairs – Carmen Pereira – 1981
 President of Guinea-Bissau (acting) – Carmen Pereira – May 1984
President of Guinea-Bissau (candidate) - Antoineta Rosa Gomes - 1994, 1999 and 2005
 Foreign minister – Hilia Barber – 1999
Minister of Justice - Antoineta Rosa Gomes - 2000-2001 
 Defence minister – Filomena Mascarenhas Tipote – 2005
 Prime Minister (acting) – Adiato Djaló Nandigna – 2012

Ivory Coast
 Minister for Women's Affairs – Jeanne Gervais – 1976
 Minister of Justice - Jacqueline Oble - 1991-1994

Kenya

Member of Parliament - Sidney Farrar – 1938
Mayor of Nairobi – Lady Gwladys Delamere – 1938
 Assistant Minister of Housing and Social Services – Julia Ojiambo – 1974
 Minister of National Heritage, Culture and Social Affairs – Winifred Nyiva Kitili Mwendwa – 1995
Minister of Justice - Martha Karua – 2006-2009
 Minister of Constitutional Affairs - Martha Karua – 2008
Foreign minister – Amina Mohamed – 2013
Cabinet Secretary for Foreign Affairs - Amina Mohamed - 2013

Lesotho

 Regent – Queen 'Mantšebo – 1941
High Court Assessor - 'Masechele Caroline Ntseliseng Khaketla - 1979
 Minister of State of Youth and Women's Affairs – Anna Matlehma Hlalele – 1986-1990
 Minister of State by the Chairperson of the Military Council – Anna Matlehma Hlalele – 1990-1992
 Minister of Trade and Industry – Morena Moletsone G. Mokroane – 1990 
 Speaker of the National Assembly – Ntlhoi Motsamai – 1999

Liberia

 Secretary of State of Education – Ellen Mills Scarborough – 1948
 Assistant Attorney General – Angie Elizabeth Brook-Randolph – 1953
 Minister of Health and Social Security – Edith Mai Wiles Padmore – 1976
 Foreign minister – Dorothy Musuleng-Cooper – 1994
Minister of Justice - Gloria Musu-Scott - (1996)
 Chairwoman of the Council of State (head of state) – Ruth Perry – 1997 
 Chief Justice - Gloria Musu-Scott - 1998-2003
 Mayor of Monrovia – Ophelia Hoff Saytumah – 2001
 President pro tempore of the Liberian Senate – Grace B. Minor – 2002
 President – Ellen Johnson Sirleaf – 2006
 Vice President – Jewel Taylor – 2018

Libya

 Minister of Education – Fatima Abd al-Hafiz Mukhtar – 1989
 Minister of Youth and Sports – Bukhanra Salem Houda – 1990
 Assistant Secretary General of The Peoples’ Congress – Salmin Ali al-Uraybi – 1990
 Assistant Secretary for Women – Salma Ahmed Rashed – 1992
 Secretary in the General Secretariat of the General Peoples' Congress for Women's Affairs – Thuriya Ramadan Abu Tabrika (Sefrian) – 1995
 Secretary for Information, Culture and Mass Mobilization – Fawziya Bashir al-Shalababi – 1995
 Secretary in the General Secretariat of the General Peoples' Congress for Social Affairs - Shalma Chabone Abduljabbar – 2000
 Secretary of People's Committees Affairs – Huda Fathi Ben Amer – 2009
 Member of the Interim National Council in charge of Legal Affairs – Salwa Fawzi El-Deghali – 2011
 Minister of Health – Fatima Hamroush – 2011
 Minister of Foreign Affairs – Najla Mangoush – 2021

Madagascar

 Minister of Revolutionary Art and Culture – Gisèle Rabesahala – 1977
 Secretary of State for University Affairs – Elénore Marguritte Nerine – 1993
 Foreign minister – Lila Ratsifandrihamanana – 1998
Minister of Justice - Alice Rajaonah - 2002-2004 
 Defence minister – Cécile Manorohanta – 2007
 Prime Minister (acting) – Cécile Manorohanta – 2009
President (Malagasy National Assembly) - Christine Razanamahasoa - 2014

Malawi

 Parliamentary Secretary to the President – Jean M. Mlanga – 1966
 Minister of State for Women's and Children’s Affairs – Edda E. Chitalo – 1994
 Foreign minister – Lilian Patel – 2000
 Interior minister – Anna Kachikho – 2005
 Vice President – Joyce Banda – 2009
 President – Joyce Banda – 2012
 Speaker of the National Assembly - Catherine Gotani Hara - 2019

Mali

 Member of Parliament - Aoua Kéita - 1960
 Minister of Social Affairs and Health – Sominé Dolo – 1965
Secretary of State for Social Affairs – Inna Sissoko Cissé – 1968
 Foreign minister – Sy Kadiatou Sow – 1994
Minister of Justice - Fatoumata Sylla - 2004-2007
 Prime minister – Cissé Mariam Kaïdama Sidibé – 2011

Mauritania

 Government minister – Aïssata Kane – 1975
 Foreign minister – Naha Mint Mouknass – 2009
 Mayor of Nouakchott – Maty Mint Hamady – 2014

Mauritius

 Minister of Women's Affairs, Prizes and Consumer's Affairs – Radhamanay Roonoosarny – 1975
Minister of Justice and Attorney General - Shirin Aumeeruddy-Cziffra - 1982-1983
Minister of Youth and Sports – Marie Claude Arouff-Parfait – 1995
 Minister of Gender Equality, Child Development and Family Welfare – Indira Thacoor Sidaya – 1995
 Minister of Social Security, National Solidarity and Reform Institutions – Sheila Bappoo – 2005
 Parliamentary Private Secretary – Kalyanee Bedwantee Juggoo – 2010
 President (acting) – Monique Ohsan Bellepeau – 2012
 Minister of Education and human Resources – Leela Devi Dookhun Luchoomun – 2014
 Speaker of the National Assembly of Mauritius - Maya Hanoomanjee 
 President – Ameenah Gurib-Fakim – 2015

Morocco

 High Commissioner for Handicapped – Aziza Bennani – 1994
 Secretary of State of Energy and Mines – Amina Benkhadra – 1997
 Secretary of State for Family Affairs - Yasmina Baddou - 2002
Secretary of State for Literacy and non-formal Education – Najima Rhozali – 2002
 Mayor (Essaouira) – Asma Chaabi – 2003
 Minister of Energy and Mines – Amina Benkhadra – 2007
Minister of Health - Yasmina Baddou - 2007
 Secretary of State for Foreign Affairs – Latifa Akherbach – 2007
 Secretary of State for Education – Latifa Labida – 2007
 Minister of Sports – Nawal El Moutawakel – 2007
 Minister of Solidarity, Women, Family, and Social Development – Nouzha Skalli (2007)
 Minister of Culture – Touriya Jabrane – 2007
 Minister of Health – Yasmina Baddou – 2007
 Ministry of Craft and Social Economy – Fatema Marouane – 2013

Mozambique

 Minister of Education and Culture – Graça Simbini Machel – 1975
 Prime Minister – Luisa Diogo – 2004
 Foreign minister – Alcinda Abreu – 2005
Minister of Justice - Esperanza Machavela - 2007-2008

Namibia 

 Minister-Delegate of Local Government & Housing – Libertine Appolus Amathila – 1987
 Minister of Local Government and Lands – Libertine Appolus Amathila – 1989
 Interior minister – Rosalia Nghidinwa – 2005
 Foreign Minister – Netumbo Nandi-Ndaitwah – 2013
 Prime Minister – Saara Kuugongelwa – 2015
 Deputy Prime Minister – Netumbo Nandi-Ndaitwah – 2015

Niger

 Minister of Social Affairs and Women's Affairs – Aïssata Moumouni – 1989
 Foreign minister – Aïchatou Mindaoudou – 1999

Nigeria

 Minister of National Planning – Adenike Ebun Oyagbola – 1979
 Finance Minister – Ngozi Okonjo-Iweala – 2003
 Foreign Minister – Ngozi Okonjo-Iweala- 2006

Anambra State

 Governor of Anambra State (South East Nigeria) – Virginia Etiaba – 2006

Rivers State
 Commissioner of Works – Felicity Okpete Ovai – 2003
 Deputy Governor of Rivers State (Southern Nigeria) – Ipalibo Banigo – 2015

Rwanda

 Minister of Social Affairs and Public Health – Madeleine Ayinkamiye – 1964
 Prime Minister – Agathe Uwilingiyimana – 1993
Minister of Justice - Agnès Ntamabyaliro Rutagwera - 1993-1994
 Minister of Foreign Affairs – Rosemary Museminali – 2008
 President of the Chamber of Deputies of Rwanda – Rose Mukantabana – 2008

Saint Helena, Ascension and Tristan da Cunha

 Secretary of External Affairs – Joan S. Dorchville – 1967
 Commissioner of Labour  – Hedwige Rosemond – 1974
 Governor – Lisa Phillips – 2016

São Tomé and Príncipe

 Minister of Culture and Education – Alda Neves da Graça do Espirito Santo – 1975
 Foreign minister – Maria do Nascimento da Graça Amorim – 1978
 Prime Minister – Maria das Neves – 2002
Minister of Justice - Edite Ramos da Costa Ten Jua - 2013-2016

Senegal

 Minister of Social Affairs – Caroline Faye Diop – 1978
Minister of Justice - Mame Madior Boye - 2000 
Prime Minister – Mame Madior Boye – 2001

Seychelles

 Minister of External Affairs and Planning – Danielle de St. Jorre – 1989
 Foreign minister – Danielle de St. Jorre – 1989

Sierra Leone

 House of Representatives (Paramount Chief Member for Moyamba District) - Ella Koblo Gulama - 1957 
 Minister of State – Ella Koblo Gulama – 1962
 Foreign minister – Shirley Gbujama – 1996
Minister of Justice and Attorney General - Priscilla Schwartz - 2018

Somalia

 Member of a City Council – Halima Godane – 1958
 Assistant Minister of Education  –  Fadumo Ahmed Alin  – 1974
 Assistant Minister of Health  – Raqiya Haji Dualeh (Raqiya Doaleh Abdalla)  – 1983
 Minister of Health  –  Nur Ilmi Uthman  – 1994
 Foreign minister – Fowsiyo Yusuf Haji Adan – 2012
 Deputy prime minister – Fowsiyo Yusuf Haji Adan – 2012

Somaliland

 Foreign minister – Edna Adan Ismail – 2003

South Africa

Union
Mayor of Pretoria – Mabel Malherbe – 1931
Member of Parliament – Leila Reitz – 1933
Leader of a political party (President of the Liberal Party of South Africa) – Margaret Ballinger – 1953
Mayor of Cape Town – Joyce Newton-Thompson – 1959

Republic
Government minister – Rina Venter – 1989
Health minister – Rina Venter – 1989
Speaker of the House - Frene Ginwala - 1994-2004 
Foreign minister – Nkosazana Dlamini-Zuma – 1999
Deputy President – Phumzile Mlambo-Ngcuka – 2005
Leader of a major political party – Helen Zille – 2007
Premier of Western Cape – Lynne Brown – 2008

Sudan

 Member of Parliament – Fatima Ahmed Ibrahim – 1965
 Deputy Minister of Youth and Sport – Nafisah Ahmad al-Amin – 1971
 Minister of State of Social Welfare – Fatima Abdel Mahmoud – 1974
 Minister of State of the Interior, Commissioner for Refugees – Fatma Abdulmahmud – 1995
 Minister of Health – Ihsan Abdallah el-Ghabshawi – 1996
 Minister of Public Service and Manpower (Labour Forces) – Agnes Lukudi – 1998
 Governor (of Bahr-al-Jabal) – Agnes Lukudi – 1994

Swaziland

 Regent – Queen Labotsibeni Mdluli – 1899
 Minister of Health – Fanny Friedman – 1987

Tanzania

  Deputy Minister for Health – Bibi Titi Mohammed – 1962
  Minister of Justice – Julie Manning – 1975
 Foreign minister – Asha-Rose Migiro – 2006 
Ministry of Constitutional and Legal Affairs - Mary Nagu - 2006-2008
President of Tanzania - Samia Suluhu Hassan - 2021–present
Minister of Defence and National Service – Stergomena Tax – 2021–present

Togo
 MP - Joséphine Hundt - 1961
 Mayor - Marie Madoé Sivomey - 1967
 Minister of Justice - Bibi Yao Savi de Tore - 1978-1982

Tunisia

 First Minister of Women's Affairs – Fethia Mzali – 1983
 First Minister of Public Health – Souad Yaacoubi – 1984
 First Minister of the Environment – Faïza Kefi – 1999
 First Minister of Vocational Training – Faïza Kefi – 2001
 First Minister of Employment – Néziha Zarrouk – 2001
 First Female Leader of a Political Party – Maya Jribi – 2006
 First Minister of Culture – Moufida Tlatli – 2011
 First Vice-President of the Legislative assembly (Constituent Assembly of Tunisia) – Meherzia Labidi Maïza – 2011
 First Second Vice-Presidente of Legislative assembly (Assembly of the Representatives of the People) – Faouzia Ben Fodha – 2014
 First Minister of Commerce – Nejla Moalla – 2014
 First Minister of Tourism – Amel Karboul – 2014

Uganda

 Foreign minister – Elizabeth Bagaya – 1974
 Vice President – Specioza Kazibwe – 1994
Minister of Justice - Janat Mukwaya - 2001-2003

Zambia
Members of Parliament – Ester Banda, Malina Chilila Margret Mbeba, Nakatindi Yeta Nganga, Madeline Robertson – 1964
Junior Minister – Nakatindi Yeta Nganga – 1966 
 Minister of Health – Mutumba Mainga Bull – 1973
Vice President – Inonge Wina – 2015
Speaker of the National Assembly – Nelly Mutti – 2021

Zanzibar
 Minister of Culture – Manical Mastura Ali Salem – 1981

Zimbabwe

 Member of Parliament – Ethel Tawse Jollie – 1923
 Mayor of Salisbury (today Harare) – Gladys Maasdorp – 1942
 Mayor of Gatooma (today Kadoma) – Maud Godsmark – 1955
 Mayor of Que Que (today Kwekwe) – Barbara Ashton – 1959
 Mayor of Bulawayo – Margot Brett – 1960
 Senators – Olive Robertson and Helena van Biljon – 1970
 Cabinet minister – Joice Mujuru – 1980
 Minister of Youth, Sport, and Recreation – Joice Mujuru – 1980
 Minister of National Resources and Tourism – Victoria Chitepo – 1982
 Minister of Education – Victoria Chitepo – 1988
 Minister of Information – Victoria Chitepo – 1988
 Minister of Posts and Telecommunications – Victoria Chitepo – 1990
 Deputy Speaker of the House of Assembly – Edna Madzongwe – 1995
 Provincial governor – Oppah Muchinguri – 2000
 Governor of Manicaland Province – Oppah Muchinguri – 2000
 Vice-President – Joice Mujuru – 2004
 President of the Senate – Edna Madzongwe – 2005
 Deputy Prime Minister – Thokozani Khupe – 2009
 President (acting) – Joice Mujuru – 2009
 Minister of Higher and Tertiary Education – Olivia Muchena – 2013
 Minister of State for Masvingo Province – Shuvai Mahofa – 2015
 National Chairperson of ZANU–PF – Oppah Muchinguri – 2017
 Minister of Defence and War Veterans Affairs – Oppah Muchinguri – 2018
 Minister of Information, Publicity and Broadcasting Services – Monica Mutsvangwa – 2018
 Minister of State for Mashonaland Central Province – Monica Mavhunga – 2018

Footnotes and references

See also
List of women heads of state
List of women heads of government
List of the first LGBT holders of political offices

Africa

First women holders of political offices
Political office-holders in Africa
African women in politics